The 1995 Australian Open was a tennis tournament played on outdoor hard courts at Flinders Park in Melbourne in Victoria in Australia. It was the 83rd edition of the Australian Open and was held from 16 through 29 January 1995.

Seniors

Men's singles

 Andre Agassi defeated  Pete Sampras 4–6, 6–1, 7–6(8–6), 6–4
 It was Agassi's 3rd career Grand Slam title and his 1st Australian Open title.

Women's singles

 Mary Pierce defeated  Arantxa Sánchez Vicario 6–3, 6–2
 It was Pierce's 1st career Grand Slam title and her only Australian Open title.

Men's doubles

 Jared Palmer /  Richey Reneberg defeated  Mark Knowles /  Daniel Nestor 6–3, 3–6, 6–3, 6–2
 It was Palmer's 1st career Grand Slam title and his only Australian Open title. It was Reneberg's 2nd and last career Grand Slam title and his only Australian Open title.

Women's doubles

 Jana Novotná /  Arantxa Sánchez Vicario defeated  Gigi Fernández /  Natasha Zvereva 6–3, 6–7(3–7), 6–4
 It was Novotná's 11th career Grand Slam title and her 4th and last Australian Open title. It was Sánchez Vicario's 10th career Grand Slam title and her 3rd Australian Open title.

Mixed doubles

 Natasha Zvereva /  Rick Leach defeated  Gigi Fernández /  Cyril Suk 7–6(7–4), 6–7(3–7), 6–4 
 It was Zvereva's 14th career Grand Slam title and her 3rd Australian Open title. It was Leach's 6th career Grand Slam title and his 3rd Australian Open title.

Juniors

Boys' singles
 Nicolas Kiefer defeated  Lee Jong-min 6–4, 6–4

Girls' singles
 Siobhan Drake-Brockman defeated  Annabel Ellwood 6–3, 4–6, 7–5

Boys' doubles
 Luke Bourgeois /  Lee Jong-min defeated  Nicolas Kiefer /  Ulrich Jasper Seetzen 6–2, 6–1

Girls' doubles
 Corina Morariu /  Ludmila Varmužová defeated  Saori Obata /  Nami Urabe 6–1, 6–2

References

External links
 Australian Open official website

 
 

 
1995 in Australian tennis
1995,Australian Open
January 1995 sports events in Australia